Szklenár is a Hungarian-language variant of the Slavic surname Sklenář (surname). Notable people with the surname include:

Gabi Szklenár (born 1978), Hungarian singer

Hungarian-language surnames
Surnames of Czech origin
Surnames of Slovak origin